DeMarre LaEdrick Carroll (born July 27, 1986) is an American professional basketball coach and former player who is an assistant coach for the Milwaukee Bucks of the National Basketball Association (NBA). He was selected as the 27th overall pick by the Memphis Grizzlies in the 2009 NBA draft. Carroll played in the NBA for 11 seasons with the Grizzlies, Houston Rockets, Denver Nuggets, Utah Jazz, Atlanta Hawks, Toronto Raptors, Brooklyn Nets and San Antonio Spurs. He played college basketball for the Vanderbilt Commodores and Missouri Tigers.

High school career
A former standout at John Carroll Catholic High School in Birmingham, he teamed with Alabama point guard Ronald Steele to lead the Cavaliers to back-to-back Alabama Class 6A state titles. He earned first team All-State, All-Area, All-Region, All-District and All-Metro recognition as a junior and senior and helped JCCHS to a combined 67–3 mark his final two seasons, culminating in those consecutive state crowns. He averaged 17.8 points and 9.1 rebounds as a junior for John Carroll's undefeated 36–0 state championship squad, before recording averages of 19.7 points and 10.7 rebounds as a senior en route to the team's 31–3 championship season. He capped his prep career by scoring a game-high 27 points in the annual Alabama-Mississippi All-Star Game and was named MVP of the 2004 Alabama Class 6A State Tournament.

Considered a three-star recruit by Rivals.com, Carroll was listed as the No. 40 small forward and the No. 148 player in the nation in 2004.

College career
After a successful sophomore year at Vanderbilt, he surprised the team when he decided to transfer to Missouri in 2006 to play for his uncle Mike Anderson.  Carroll helped lead Missouri to the Elite Eight (national quarterfinals) of the 2009 NCAA Division I men's basketball tournament during his senior year. He was nicknamed the "Junkyard Dog" because of his toughness and relentless play.

Health issues
When Carroll came to Missouri, he complained of itchy legs, and was convinced that he was suffering from an allergy. After he was examined by several specialists, they came up with a considerably more serious diagnosis—liver disease. It was ultimately determined that Carroll would possibly need a liver transplant, but not for at least 20 years after his diagnosis and most likely after the end of any potential professional basketball career. His illness was revealed several weeks before the 2009 NBA draft. At 1:30 a.m. on July 5, 2007, Carroll was shot in the ankle during a domestic dispute at a nightclub in Columbia, Missouri.

NBA career

Memphis Grizzlies (2009–2011)
Carroll was drafted in the first round, 27th overall, by the Memphis Grizzlies. He played primarily off the bench during his tenure with the Memphis Grizzlies. On December 14, 2010, he was assigned to the Dakota Wizards of the NBA D-League. He was recalled on January 5, 2011.

Houston Rockets (2011)
On February 24, 2011, Carroll was traded, along with Hasheem Thabeet and a future first-round draft pick, to the Houston Rockets in exchange for Shane Battier and Ish Smith. On April 11, 2011, he was waived by the Rockets.

Denver Nuggets (2011–2012)
On December 12, 2011, the Denver Nuggets made Carroll a non-guaranteed training camp invitee. He appeared in four games with the Nuggets during the 2011–12 regular season before being waived on February 4, 2012.

Utah Jazz (2012–2013)
On February 8, 2012, Carroll signed with the Utah Jazz.

Atlanta Hawks (2013–2015)

On August 3, 2013, Carroll signed with the Atlanta Hawks. On February 22, 2014, he scored a then career-high 24 points in the 107–98 win over the New York Knicks.

On December 23, 2014, Carroll scored a then career-high 25 points, while also grabbing a team-high 10 rebounds, in the 107–104 win over the Los Angeles Clippers. On February 4, 2015, he was part of the Hawks' starting line-up that were named the co-Kia Eastern Conference Players of the Month for January after the club compiled the first 17–0 record in a calendar month in league history. Five days later, he scored a career-high 26 points in the 117–105 win over the Minnesota Timberwolves.

Toronto Raptors (2015–2017)
On July 9, 2015, Carroll signed a four-year, $60 million contract with the Toronto Raptors. He made his debut for the Raptors in their season opener on October 28, 2015, recording 14 points and eight rebounds in a 106–99 win over the Indiana Pacers. On December 7, 2015, he was ruled out indefinitely with a bruised right knee. He returned to action on December 26 against the Milwaukee Bucks after missing nine straight games with the injury. He managed just five games before the same knee forced him to sit out the team's loss to the Cleveland Cavaliers on January 4, 2016. Two days later, he underwent surgery on his right knee. On April 7, 2016, he returned to action against the Atlanta Hawks after missing 41 games.

On January 8, 2017, Carroll tied a career high with 26 points and set a career high with six three-pointers on 10 attempts in a 129–122 loss to the Houston Rockets.

Brooklyn Nets (2017–2019)

On July 13, 2017, Carroll was traded, along with 2018 first and second round draft picks, to the Brooklyn Nets in exchange for Justin Hamilton. In his debut for the Nets in their season opener on October 18, 2017, Carroll scored 10 points in a 140–131 loss to the Indiana Pacers. On November 26, 2017, he scored a season-high 24 points in a 98–88 win over the Memphis Grizzlies.

San Antonio Spurs (2019–2020)
On July 6, 2019, Carroll was traded to the San Antonio Spurs in a three-team trade.

Return to Houston (2020)
After getting waived by the Spurs, Carroll was signed by the Houston Rockets on February 21, 2020.

Coaching career
On August 2, 2022, Carroll was announced as an assistant coach for the Milwaukee Bucks. He joined the staff of head coach Mike Budenholzer who Carroll played under on the Atlanta Hawks.

NBA career statistics

Regular season

|-
| align="left" | 
| align="left" | Memphis
| 71 || 1 || 11.2 || .396 || .000 || .623 || 2.1 || .5 || .4 || .1 || 2.9
|-
| align="left" | 
| align="left" | Memphis
| 7 || 0 || 5.6 || .444 || .000 || 1.000 || 1.1 || .3 || .1 || .1 || 1.4
|-
| align="left" | 
| align="left" | Houston
| 5 || 0 || 2.2 || .000 || .000 || .000 || .0 || .4 || .0 || .0 || .0
|-
| align="left" | 
| align="left" | Denver
| 4 || 0 || 5.3 || 1.000 || .000 || .000 || .8 || .8 || .0 || .0 || 3.0
|-
| align="left" | 
| align="left" | Utah
| 20 || 9 || 16.4 || .374 || .368 || .875 || 2.5 || .8 || .6 || .1 || 4.8
|-
| align="left" | 
| align="left" | Utah
| 66 || 12 || 16.8 || .460 || .286 || .765 || 2.8 || .9 || .9 || .4 || 6.0
|-
| align="left" | 
| align="left" | Atlanta
| 73 || 73 || 32.1 || .470 || .362 || .773 || 5.5 ||1.8|| 1.5 || .3 || 11.1 
|-
| align="left" | 
| align="left" | Atlanta
| 70 || 69 || 31.3 || .487 || .395 || .702 || 5.3 || 1.7 || 1.3 || .2 ||12.6
|-
| align="left" | 
| align="left" | Toronto
| 26 || 22 || 30.2 || .389 || .390 || .600 || 4.7 || 1.0 || 1.7 || .2 || 11.0 
|-
| align="left" | 
| align="left" | Toronto
| 72 || 72 || 26.1 || .401 || .341 || .761 || 3.8 || 1.0 || 1.1 || .4 || 8.9 
|-
| align="left" | 
| align="left" | Brooklyn
| 73 || 73 || 29.9 || .414 || .371 || .764 || 6.6 || 2.0 || .8 || .4 || 13.5
|-
| align="left" | 
| align="left" | Brooklyn
| 67 || 8 || 25.4 || .395 || .342 || .760 || 5.2 || 1.3 || .5 || .1 || 11.1
|-
| align="left" | 
| align="left" | San Antonio
| 15 || 0 || 9.0 || .310 || .231 || .600 || 2.1 || .7 || .1 || .1 || 2.2
|-
| align="left" | 
| align="left" | Houston
| 9 || 0 || 17.2 || .432 || .250 || .773 || 2.7 || 1.6 || .7 || .3 || 6.0
|- class="sortbottom"
| style="text-align:center;" colspan="2"| Career
| 578 || 339 || 23.7 || .430 || .358 || .741 || 4.2 || 1.3 || .9 || .3 || 8.9

Playoffs

|-
| align="left" | 2012
| align="left" | Utah
| 4 || 0 || 18.3 || .474 || .200 || .000 || 3.8 || .8 || .5 || .3 || 4.8
|-
| align="left" | 2014
| align="left" | Atlanta
| 7 || 7 || 35.1 || .469 || .409 || .636 || 4.9 || 1.6 || .7 || .4 || 8.9
|-
| align="left" | 2015
| align="left" | Atlanta
| 16 || 16 || 34.9 || .486 || .403 || .780 || 6.1 || 2.0 || 1.1 || .3 || 14.6
|-
| align="left" | 2016
| align="left" | Toronto
| 20 || 19 || 29.8 || .390 || .328 || .750 || 4.1 || .9 || .9 || .4 || 8.9
|-
| align="left" | 2017
| align="left" | Toronto
| 10 || 7 || 15.5 || .405 || .318 || .556 || 2.7 || .5 || .8 || .5 || 4.2
|-
| align="left" | 2019
| align="left" | Brooklyn
| 5 || 3 || 23.8 || .237 || .292 || 1.000 || 4.0 || .4 || .8 || .0 || 6.6
|-
| align="left" | 2020
| align="left" | Houston
| 3 || 0 || 3.0 || .500 || .000 || .000 || 1.5 || .5 || .0 || .0 || 1.0
|- class="sortbottom"
| style="text-align:center;" colspan="2"| Career
| 64 || 52 || 27.4 || .426 || .353 || .752 || 4.3 || 1.1 || .9 || .3 || 8.9

Personal life
Carroll is the nephew of former Missouri and former Arkansas men's basketball coach Mike Anderson.

Awards
2004 High School 6A Finals MVP
2004 Alabama-Mississippi Game MVP
2007 Rivals.com Top Transfer
2009 First Team All-Big 12
2009 Academic All-Big 12 Team
2009 Big 12 men's basketball tournament MVP

References

External links

 Missouri Tigers bio

1986 births
Living people
African-American basketball players
American expatriate basketball people in Canada
American men's basketball coaches
American men's basketball players
American shooting survivors
Atlanta Hawks players
Basketball coaches from Alabama
Basketball players from Birmingham, Alabama
Brooklyn Nets players
Dakota Wizards players
Denver Nuggets players
Houston Rockets players
Memphis Grizzlies draft picks
Memphis Grizzlies players
Milwaukee Bucks assistant coaches
Missouri Tigers men's basketball players
San Antonio Spurs players
Small forwards
Toronto Raptors players
Utah Jazz players
Vanderbilt Commodores men's basketball players